London Boy or London Boys may refer to:

 London Boys, a German-based English dance-pop duo (active 1986–1996)
London Boy (David Bowie album) (1996)
London Boy (mixtape), a mixtape by Chip (2012)
"London Boy" (song), a 2019 song by Taylor Swift
"The London Boys", a song by David Bowie (1966)
"London Boys" (T. Rex song) (1976)
"London Boys", a song by the Johnny Thunders from So Alone (1978)